Events from the year 1528 in art.

Events
Plague ravishes Venice, Bergamo and other Italian cities.  Several eminent artists die in the outbreak.

Works

 Antonio da Correggio
 Madonna of St. Jerome (approximate completion date)
 Venus and Cupid with a Satyr
 Lucas Cranach the Elder
 Adam and Eve
 The Judgement of Paris (approximate date)
 Hans Holbein the Younger – The Artist's Family
 Pontormo – work in Capponi Chapel of Santa Felicita di Firenze
 Annunciation (fresco)
 The Deposition from the Cross (altarpiece)

Births
February 29 – Albert V, Duke of Bavaria, art patron and collector (died 1579)
date unknown
Theodor de Bry, Flemish engraver and draftsman (died 1598)
Sigmund Feyerabend, German bookseller and wood-engraver (died 1590)
Bernardino India, Italian painter (died 1590)
Marco Marchetti, Italian painter (died 1588)
Gillis Mostaert and Frans Mostaert, Dutch painters, twin sons of Jan Mostaert (died 1598) and 1560) respectively
Paolo Veronese, Italian painter of the Renaissance in Venice (died 1588)
Caterina van Hemessen, Flemish Renaissance  painter (died 1587)

Deaths
April 26 – Albrecht Dürer, German painter, printmaker and theorist from Nuremberg, Germany (born 1471)
July - Palma Vecchio, Italian painter of the Venetian school (born 1480)
July 3 - Floriano Ferramola, Italian painter (date of birth unknown)
August - Pietro Torrigiano, Italian sculptor (born 1472)
August 31  – Matthias Grünewald, German painter (born 1470)
date unknown
Pier Jacopo Alari Bonacolsi - North Italian sculptor, known for his finely detailed small bronzes (born 1460)
Jan de Beer, Dutch painter (born 1475)
Jacob van Laethem - Flemish painter of the Early Netherlandish painting era (born 1470)
Peter Vischer the Younger, German sculptor (born 1487)
victims of the plague
Pier Jacopo Alari Bonacolsi, Italian sculptor (born c.1460)
Domenico Caprioli, Italian painter (born 1494)
Maturino da Firenze, Italian painter (born 1490)
Gianfrancesco Penni, Italian painter (born c.1488)
Andrea Previtali, Italian painter (born c.1490)
probable - Wilm Dedeke, late gothic painter from Northern Germany (born 1460)

References

 
Years of the 16th century in art